David F. Girard-diCarlo (born 1943 near Philadelphia, Pennsylvania) is an American lawyer and former diplomat.

Life
Girard-diCarlo received his bachelor's degree from Saint Joseph's University and studied law at the Villanova University School of Law. After completing law school, he began his career as an associate with Wolf Block LLP, before moving on to Dilworth Paxon LLP, where he became a partner.  He left Dilworth to take the position of chairman of the South Eastern Pennsylvania Transportation Authority before returning to the lawfirm environment in 1991.

In 1992, Girard-diCarlo began his work for Blank Rome LLP, where he served for 16 years as managing partner and CEO, eventually holding the position of chairman for six years. He was also appointed as the CEO of subsidiary Blank Rome Government Relations LLC, the lobbying branch of the law firm based in Washington, D.C.

In 2000, he was chairman of the Bush-Cheney election campaign in Pennsylvania.

In 2002 and 2003, he was named to the PoliticsPA list of "Sy Snyder's Power 50" list of politically influential individuals.

David F. Girard-diCarlo was nominated as the U.S. ambassador to Austria following Susan McCaw's resignation from the post.  
He was confirmed by the United States Congress on June 27, 2008. 
He was sworn in by Secretary of State Condoleezza Rice on July 1, and arrived in Vienna on July 3, 2008 to host the July 4th reception in his future residence.

On December 10, 2008, the Ambassador announced his intention to resign from the post following the inauguration of Barack Obama on January 20, 2009.

Girard-diCarlo has been a major contributor to Republican Party campaigns, including most recently the presidential campaign of John McCain.

See also
United States Department of State
Ambassadors of the United States
List of alumni of Villanova University

References

External links
Girard-diCarlo's bio from Cozen O'Connor

1943 births
Living people
Ambassadors of the United States to Austria
Pennsylvania lawyers
Political activists from Pennsylvania
Pennsylvania Republicans
Saint Joseph's University alumni
Villanova University School of Law alumni